Boar-baiting is a blood sport involving the baiting of wild boars against dogs. 

Villagers in Indonesia call the event "adu bagong" translated as boar fighting. Boar-baiting began in the 1960s, to test hunting dogs against wild boars. In 2017, an online petition demanding the halt was created by animal rights organizations and the Government of Indonesia banned boar-baiting.

See also

 Hog-baiting

References

External links
 Video: Boar-baiting in West Java
 Video: Boar-baiting Malaysia

Baiting (blood sport)
Wild boars